The 1978 World Junior Ice Hockey Championships (1978 WJHC) was the second edition Ice Hockey World Junior Championship and was held from December 22, 1977, until January 3, 1978. The tournament was held in Canada, mainly in Montreal and Quebec City.  The Soviet Union won its second consecutive gold medal, while Sweden won the silver, and Canada the bronze.

Final standings
The 1978 tournament divided participants into two divisions of four teams, each playing three games.  The top two teams in each division advanced to the medal round (Group A), while the bottom two were placed in Group B.  Each division played another round robin.  The top two teams in the medal round played a one-game final for the gold medal.

This is the aggregate standings, ordered according to final placing.  The four teams in the medal round (Group A) were ranked one through four, while the four teams in Group B were ranked five through eight regardless of overall record.

 was relegated to Pool B for the 1979 World Junior Ice Hockey Championships.

Preliminary round

Gold group

Blue group

Championship round

Group B

Group A

Gold medal game

Scoring leaders

Tournament awards

References

 
1977–81 World Junior Hockey Championships at TSN

Statistical leaders at eliteprospects.com

1978
1978 World Junior Ice Hockey Championships
World Junior Ice Hockey Championships
1978 World Junior Ice Hockey Championships
1978 World Junior Ice Hockey Championships
December 1977 sports events in Canada
January 1978 sports events in Canada
Ice hockey competitions in Montreal
Sports competitions in Quebec City
1978 in Quebec
1970s in Quebec City
1970s in Montreal
Sport in Cornwall, Ontario
Ice hockey competitions in Ontario
1977 in Quebec
1977 in Ontario